Drual is a small group of indigenous Australian languages of the Kulinic family. The two languages are,
Bungandidj (Buwandik)
Kuurn Kopan Noot

Warrnambool shares some features with Bungandidj, but is too poorly attested to classify securely.

 
Kulinic languages